Caddy may refer to:

 Caddie, also spelled caddy, a golfer's assistant
 A shopping caddy
 A box or bin, such as a "green bin" for food waste
 Caddy (bridge), an assistant to a tournament director
 Caddy (surname)
 Caddy (given name)
 Caddy (tea), a receptacle used to store tea
 Caddy (hardware), a protective case for an electronic module
 Catty or Caddy, an Asian unit of weight 
 Caddy, nickname of Cadborosaurus, a sea serpent in folklore
 Caddy, Shetland term for a home reared orphan animal
 Caddy (barbell), a 45 pound barbell weight
 Caddy (web server), an open-source web server

People 
 Caddy (fl. 1990s), Romanian musician in B.U.G. Mafia

Places 
 Caddy, County Antrim, Northern Ireland, a townland
 Caddy Lake, Manitoba, Canada

Arts and entertainment 
 The Caddy, a 1950s film starring Dean Martin and Jerry Lewis
 "The Caddy" (Seinfeld), a television episode
 Caddy, a fictional character in the novel The Sound and the Fury by William Faulkner

Automobiles 
 Caddy, an informal name for a Cadillac 
 Volkswagen Caddy, a light commercial van

See also 

Cady (disambiguation)
CADD (disambiguation)
Caddie (disambiguation)
Caddo (disambiguation)
Candy (disambiguation)
Cardy (disambiguation)
Cuddy (disambiguation)
 Khadi